The following are the Pulitzer Prizes for 1948.

Journalism awards

Public Service:
 St. Louis Post-Dispatch for the coverage of the Centralia mine disaster in Illinois, and the follow-up which resulted in impressive reforms in mine safety laws and regulations.
Local Reporting:
 George E. Goodwin of the Atlanta Journal for his story of the Telfair County vote fraud, published in 1947.
National Reporting:
 Nat S. Finney of the Minneapolis Tribune for his stories on the plan of the Truman administration to impose secrecy about the ordinary affairs of federal civilian agencies in peacetime.
 Bert Andrews of the New York Herald Tribune for his articles on "A State Department Security Case" published in 1947.
International Reporting:
 Paul W. Ward of The Baltimore Sun for his series of articles published in 1947 on "Life in the Soviet Union".
Editorial Writing:
 Virginius Dabney of the Richmond Times-Dispatch for distinguished editorial writing during the year.
Editorial Cartooning:
 Reuben Goldberg of the New York Sun for "Peace Today".
Photography:
 Frank Cushing of the  Boston Traveler for his photo, "Boy Gunman and Hostage".

Letters, Drama and Music Awards

Fiction:
 Tales of the South Pacific by James A. Michener (Macmillan).
Drama:
 A Streetcar Named Desire by Tennessee Williams (New Directions).
History:
 Across the Wide Missouri by Bernard De Voto (Harper).
Biography or Autobiography:
 Forgotten First Citizen: John Bigelow by Margaret Clapp (Little).
Poetry:
 The Age of Anxiety by W. H. Auden (Random).
Music:
 Symphony, No. 3 by Walter Piston first performed by the Boston Symphony Orchestra in Boston, January 1948.

Special citations
 Frank D. Fackenthal, acting president of Columbia University, was awarded a scroll recognizing his years of service to the Pulitzer Prizes.

References

External links
Pulitzer Prizes for 1948

Pulitzer Prizes by year
Pulitzer Prize
Pulitzer Prize